Marzuban ibn Muhammad ibn Shaddad was a Kurdish ruler, the brother of Lashkari ibn Muhammad. He succeeded his brother to the throne of the Shaddadids in 978. He was incompetent, however, and reigned only until his murder by his younger brother Fadl ibn Muhammad in 985.

Sources
 
 

985 deaths
Emirs of Ganja
Shaddadids
10th-century murdered monarchs
Kurdish rulers
10th-century Kurdish people